The 1946 Massachusetts State Aggies football team was an American football team that represented Massachusetts State College in the Yankee Conference during the 1946 college football season. In their third season under head coach Walter Hargesheimer, the Aggies compiled a 6–2 record (1–1 against conference opponents) and outscored opponents by a total of 184 to 48. The 1946 season was the team's last as the Massachusetts State Aggies, as they would begin play in 1947 as the University of Massachusetts Redmen.

The team played its home games at Alumni Field in Amherst, Massachusetts.

Schedule

References

Massachusetts State
UMass Minutemen football seasons
Massachusetts State Aggies football